The 2013 Kazakhstan First Division was the 19th edition of Kazakhstan First Division, the second level football competition in Kazakhstan. 18 teams to play against each other on home-away system. The top team gains promotion to the Premier League next season, while the second-placed team enters playoff series with the eleventh team of the Premier League.

Teams

Team overview

League table

Promotion play-off

Relegation play-off

Statistics

Top scorers

References

External links

soccerway.com; standings, results, fixtures

Kazakhstan First Division seasons
2
Kazakhstan
Kazakhstan